Vicente Flores can refer to:

 Vicente Flores (footballer)
 Vicente Flores (politician)